HRAFC may refer to:

Harrogate Railway Athletic F.C.
Hawick Royal Albert F.C.